The guarantees of non-repetition is a component of reparations as stipulated in the United Nations Office of the United Nations High Commissioner for Human Rights resolution proclaiming the Basic Principles and Guidelines on the Right to a Remedy and Reparation for Victims of Gross Violations of International Human Rights Law and Serious Violations of International Humanitarian Law. Guarantees of non-repetition are post-conflict measures taken to ensure that systemic human rights abuses do not recur.

See also 
Convention on the Rights of the Child
 Human Rights Day
International Court of Justice
 Reparation (legal), the legal philosophy
Reparations for slavery, proposed compensation for the Transatlantic Slave Trade, to assist the descendants of enslaved peoples and the communities affected
UN Charter
Universal Declaration of Human Rights

External links 
 International Days
 Human Rights Day - United Nations
 International Day for the Right to the Truth

International criminal law
Justice
Reparations